Jason Clarke (born 17 July 1969) is an Australian actor. He has appeared in many TV series, and is known for playing Tommy Caffee on the television series Brotherhood. He has also appeared in many films, often as an antagonist. His film roles include Zero Dark Thirty (2012), White House Down (2013), Dawn of the Planet of the Apes (2014), Terminator Genisys (2015), Everest (2015), All I See Is You (2016), Mudbound (2017), Chappaquiddick (2017), First Man (2018), and Pet Sematary (2019). In 2022, he starred in the HBO sports drama series Winning Time: The Rise of the Lakers Dynasty as former Los Angeles Lakers player turned coach Jerry West.

Early life
Clarke was born and brought up in Winton, Queensland. His father worked as a sheep shearer in rural South Australia outside a small township of Padthaway on the Limestone Coast. His family also lived in North Queensland, where Clarke completed his secondary schooling at Ignatius Park College. Clarke began studying law in 1987, however before completing his studies, he chose to instead pursue acting as a career, enrolling in the Sydney Actor's Studio.
He then went on to study at the Victorian College of the Arts in Melbourne, graduating in 1994.

Career
Clarke has made many Australian television appearances, including Murder Call, Wildside, Home and Away, Heartbreak High, Blue Heelers, All Saints, Farscape, White Collar Blue, and Stingers. He played Tommy Caffee on the Showtime series Brotherhood. He has appeared in such films as The Human Contract, Death Race, and Rabbit-Proof Fence.

Clarke played "Red" Hamilton in the 2009 film Public Enemies. In April 2010, he was cast in the thriller film Texas Killing Fields. He also played Detective Jarek Wysocki in the 2011 Fox series The Chicago Code and CIA interrogator Dan in the 2012 film Zero Dark Thirty. Clarke played a major role in the 2012 crime film Lawless. He played George Wilson in the 2013 remake of The Great Gatsby. Also, in 2013, he played ruthless terrorist leader Emil Stenz in White House Down. He played Malcolm in the 2014 blockbuster film Dawn of the Planet of the Apes. In 2015's Terminator Genisys, Clarke portrayed John Connor, and the film grossed over $440 million worldwide. In 2019, Clarke starred as Louis Creed in the new adaptation of Stephen King's novel, Pet Sematary.

Personal life 
Clarke is married to actress and model Cécile Breccia. They have two children.

Filmography

Awards and nominations

References

External links

1969 births
Australian male film actors
Australian male television actors
Living people
Male actors from Queensland
20th-century Australian male actors
21st-century Australian male actors
Shire of Winton
Victorian College of the Arts alumni